Dayton is a town in Sheffield Township, Tippecanoe County, in the U.S. state of Indiana. The population was 1,420 at the 2010 census.

It is part of the Lafayette, Indiana Metropolitan Statistical Area.

History
Dayton was known as Fairfield until 1830. The post office at Dayton has been in operation since 1831.

Dayton Historic District was listed on the National Register of Historic Places in 2003.

Geography

Demographics

2010 census
As of the census of 2010, there were 1,420 people, 536 households, and 398 families living in the town. The racial makeup of the town was 95.4% White, 0.9% African American, 0.6% Native American, 0.2% Asian, 1.1% from other races, and 1.8% from two or more races. Hispanic or Latino of any race were 3.6% of the population.

There were 536 households, of which 41.8% had children under the age of 18 living with them, 52.1% were married couples living together, 13.6% had a female householder with no husband present, 8.6% had a male householder with no wife present, and 25.7% were non-families. 20.3% of all households were made up of individuals, and 4.1% had someone living alone who was 65 years of age or older. The average household size was 2.65 and the average family size was 3.03.

The median age in the town was 32 years. 29.2% of residents were under the age of 18; 8% were between the ages of 18 and 24; 32.3% were from 25 to 44; 22.5% were from 45 to 64; and 8.1% were 65 years of age or older. The gender makeup of the town was 49.7% male and 50.3% female.

2000 census
As of the census of 2000, there were 1,120 people, 401 households, and 313 families living in the town. The racial makeup of the town was 79.23% White, 18.18% African American, 0.27% Native American, 0.98% from other races, and 1.34% from two or more races. Hispanic or Latino of any race were 2.05% of the population.

There were 401 households, out of which 49.1% had children under the age of 18 living with them, 59.4% were married couples living together, 14.7% had a female householder with no husband present, and 21.9% were non-families. 18.2% of all households were made up of individuals, and 7.0% had someone living alone who was 65 years of age or older. The average household size was 2.79 and the average family size was 3.15.

In the town, the population was spread out, with 33.4% under the age of 18, 7.9% from 18 to 24, 33.8% from 25 to 44, 16.3% from 45 to 64, and 8.7% who were 65 years of age or older. The median age was 30 years. For every 100 females, there were 95.5 males. For every 100 females age 18 and over, there were 91.3 males.

The median income for a household in the town was $44,792, and the median income for a family was $48,021. Males had a median income of $42,813 versus $25,950 for females. The per capita income for the town was $17,401. About 10.0% of families and 7.9% of the population were below the poverty line, including 8.3% of those under age 18 and 12.2% of those age 65 or over.

Trivia
 Shannon Hoon of the band Blind Melon was born and raised in the area around Dayton and is buried in Dayton Cemetery on the east edge of town.
 Dayton is the subject of a Lefty Hazmat song of the same name.

Gallery

References

Towns in Tippecanoe County, Indiana
Towns in Indiana
Populated places established in 1829
1829 establishments in Indiana
Lafayette metropolitan area, Indiana